Rasquachismo is a theory developed by Chicano scholar Tomás Ybarra-Frausto to describe "an underdog perspective, a view from los de abajo" (from below) in working class Chicano communities which uses elements of "hybridization, juxtaposition, and integration" as a means of empowerment and resistance. Rasquachismo is commonly used to describe aesthetics present in the working class Chicano art and Mexican art movements which "make the most from the least." It has been described as a worldview, the "view of the underdog, which combines inventiveness with a survivalist attitude." 

Rasquachismo is rooted in the older term rasquache, which is the English form of the Spanish term rascuache, of Nahuatl origin. While the term was widely used as a classist slur, it has been reclaimed to highlight the creativity and uniqueness in Chicano and Mexican working-class communities. Beyond being simply frugal, the rasquache philosophy also involves inventing new uses for conventional objects. This may mean giving a new function to something that would conventionally be considered broken or otherwise 'useless.'

Term 
Rasquachismo is rooted in the term rasquache, which is the English form of the Spanish term rascuache, of Nahuatl origin. The Spanish term has negative connotations in Mexico and Latin America, since it is used to describe anything lower class or impoverished. In this context, rasquache is used to mean "ghetto." Behavior such as reusing plastic utensils and zip lock bags could be described as "rasquache" in a negative way by people of upper classes. Ybarra-Frausto coined the term rasquachismo in 1989.

Artistic context
In the artistic context, the term is used to describe art which overcomes material and professional limitations faced by artists. Rasquache art uses the most basic, simplest, quickest, and crudest means necessary to create the desired expression, in essence, creating the most from the least. The term can also be used to reference the bicultural inspiration from which these artists draw inspiration.	

Amalia Mesa-Bains, artist and writer, writes that "In rasquachismo, the irreverent and spontaneous are employed to make the most from the least... one has a stance that is both defiant and inventive. Aesthetic expression comes from discards, fragments, even recycled everyday materials... The capacity to hold life together with bits of string, old coffee cans, and broken mirrors in a dazzling gesture of aesthetic bravado is at the heart of rasquachismo." When employed by female artists, she calls it Domesticana, but cautions that these terms should not be understood as applying to all Chicano artists. Making the most with the least is a statement of irreverence and is both "defiant and inventive."

Quotes on Rasquachismo

See also
Self Help Graphics & Art
DIY ethic

References

External links

 
 

 

Chicano art
Latin American culture
Hispanic and Latino American history
Spanish language
Mexican Spanish